The Longshot is an American rock band formed in Oakland, California in 2018 by Green Day frontman Billie Joe Armstrong.

History
The band was formed in April 2018 by Billie Joe Armstrong following the conclusion of Green Day's Revolution Radio World Tour. Armstrong was joined by at the time touring guitarist for Green Day, Jeff Matika, who elected to be the band's bassist. The group was rounded out by drummer David S. Field, and rhythm guitarist Kevin Preston of the band, Prima Donna. Preston also played guitar in Green Day's other side project, Foxboro Hot Tubs.

The band released their self-titled debut EP quietly on streaming services on April 12, 2018, which was followed by the announcement of their debut studio album, Love Is for Losers, releasing the following week. To support the album, the band set out on a North American tour that summer.

Following the formation of the band, many Green Day fans started questioning if the band had broken up. Armstrong denied these claims, and also denounced anyone that speculated that Green Day had broken up by telling them to "shut the fuck up."

The band has also released three additional EPs before and after Love Is for Losers; Return To Sender, Razor Baby, and Bullets. Armstrong also used the band to release three songs he had written for the movie, Ordinary World, which he also stars in. The song "Devil's Kind" was released as a standalone single, while "Body Bag" was released on Love Is for Losers, and "Fever Blister" released on Razor Baby.

Members
Billie Joe Armstrong - lead vocals, lead guitar, production 
Jeff Matika - bass 
Kevin Preston - rhythm guitar 
David S. Field - drums, production

Discography
Studio albums
 Love Is for Losers (2018)

Extended plays
 The Longshot EP (2018)
 Return to Sender (2018)
 Razor Baby (2018)
 Bullets (2018)

Singles
 "Devil's Kind" (2018)

References

Musical groups established in 2018
Musical groups from California
2018 establishments in California